Silvian Cristescu (born 29 October 1970) is a Romanian former professional footballer who played as a midfielder for CS Universitatea Craiova, FC Universitatea Craiova, Extensiv Craiova, Panelefsiniakos, BFC Dynamo and Steaua București. After retirement Cristescu was the vice-president of FC Universitatea Craiova and since 2014 is the sporting director of CS Universitatea Craiova.

Captain of the white and blues in various occasions and with over 230 matches played for Craiova, both CS and FC, Cristescu was nicknamed "Il Capitano" (the captain).

International career
Silvian Cristescu made its debut for Romania on 31 January 1993 in a match against Ecuador, playing in total 5 matches, but without scoring any goal.

Honours

Player
 CS Universitatea Craiova
 Divizia A: Winner 1990–91
 Cupa României: Winner 1990–91

 FC Universitatea Craiova
 Cupa României: Winner 1992–93; Runner-up (3) 1993–94, 1997–98, 1999–2000

 Extensiv Craiova
 Divizia B: Winner 1998–99

 Berliner FC Dynamo
 NOFV-Oberliga: Winner 2000–01

References

External links
 
 

1970 births
Living people
People from Olt County
Romanian footballers
Romania international footballers
Association football midfielders
Liga I players
CS Universitatea Craiova players
FC U Craiova 1948 players
FC Steaua București players
Liga II players
FC Caracal (2004) players
Oberliga (football) players
Berliner FC Dynamo players
Super League Greece players
Panelefsiniakos F.C. players
Romanian expatriate footballers
Romanian expatriate sportspeople in Greece
Expatriate footballers in Greece
Romanian expatriate sportspeople in Germany
Expatriate footballers in Germany